Charles Palmer is an English television director, best known for his work on Poldark, Doctor Who, and Agatha Christie's Marple.

Early and personal life
Palmer is the son of actor Geoffrey Palmer (1927–2020) and Sally Green. He was married to actress Claire Skinner from 2001 to 2015. The couple had two sons, William John (b. 1999) and Thomas Henry (b. 2002).

Selected filmography
Agatha Christie's Marple
"The Murder at the Vicarage" (2004)
"A Pocket Full of Rye" (2009)
"A Caribbean Mystery" (2013)
Doctor Who
"Smith and Jones" (2007)
"The Shakespeare Code" (2007)
"Human Nature" (2007)
"The Family of Blood" (2007)
"Oxygen" (2017)
"The Eaters of Light" (2017)
Lark Rise to Candleford
Series 1, Episode 1 (2008)
Series 1, Episode 2 (2008)
Series 1, Episode 3 (2008)
Series 1, Episode 5 (2008)
By Any Means (2013)

His picture is used in the opening credits of As Time Goes By beside Judi Dench's daughter, Finty Williams.  The series starred his father, Geoffrey Palmer.

Sources and notes

External links
 

1965 births
Living people
British television directors